Cranesville is a populated place situated in Montgomery County, New York, United States. It is hamlet within the town of Amsterdam on New York State Route 5, along the Mohawk River. The community is named after early settler David Crane. Cranesville was struck by a tornado in September of 2011 which caused significant tree damage along with some damage to buildings.

References

,

Hamlets in Montgomery County, New York